Shankar Narayan Bank is a 1956 Bengali film directed by Niren Lahiri. This is a drama film. The film stars Chhabi Biswas Kaberi Bose, Chhaya Devi, Vasant Choudhury, Nilima Das, Anubha Gupta, Anup Kumar and Uttam Kumar in the lead roles. This film was produced by Sunrise Films and distributed under the banner of Nandan Pictures.

Cast
 Chhabi Biswas
 Kaberi Bose
 Chhaya Devi
 Uttam Kumar
 Vasant Choudhury
 Nilima Das
 Anubha Gupta
 Anup Kumar

Music
"Etodin Por Tomaro Roth" - Sandhya Mukherjee

References

External links
 

Bengali-language Indian films
1956 films
1950s Bengali-language films
Indian drama films
1956 drama films
Indian black-and-white films